Frank Carter may refer to:

Frank Carter (diver) (born 1942), British Olympic diver
Frank Carter (murderer) (1881–1927), Irish-born sniper murderer in Omaha, Nebraska
Frank Carter (politician) (1910–1988), Irish Fianna Fáil politician
Frank Carter (American football) (born 1977), American football player
Frank Carter (musician) (born 1984), English vocalist formerly of the bands Gallows and Pure Love, now of Frank Carter & the Rattlesnakes
Sir Frank Willington Carter (1865–1945), British philanthropist and co-founder of the British Empire Leprosy Relief Association

See also

Francis Carter (disambiguation)